Anne Michelle Essam (born 6 January 1992) is a Cameroonian handball player for FAP Yaoundé and the Cameroonian national team.

She participated at the 2017 World Women's Handball Championship.

References

1992 births
Living people
Cameroonian female handball players
Competitors at the 2019 African Games
African Games competitors for Cameroon
African Games medalists in handball
21st-century Cameroonian women
African Games silver medalists for Cameroon